State Highway 10 (SH 10) is a road in the Far North District of the North Island of New Zealand. Both ends of the road adjoin . With the exception of SH 1, it is the country's northernmost state highway.

Route
Passing the Bay of Islands, the road turns to the north-west and reaches the coast at Whangaroa Harbour, then heads inland again before meeting the coast once more at the Taipa-Mangonui settlements.

As with several roads in the Far North District, the highway is prone to flooding at some times of the year. Heavy rains in August 2012 caused major subsidence to undermine parts of the highway near Kaeo, which required substantial repair. The road is narrow in places, due to the nature of the landscape around the highway, though substantial improvements have been made since 2010 to one of the most dangerous stretches at Bulls Gorge, south of Kerikeri.

Major intersections

See also
List of New Zealand state highways
List of roads and highways, for notable or famous roads worldwide

References

10
Transport in the Northland Region